Sidney Edward Boyum (1914 – February 22, 1991) was an industrial photographer, sculptor and graphic artist in Madison, Wisconsin, United States. Much of his work falls into the category of outsider art. Today, Boyum is best known for his public sculptures scattered throughout the Schenk-Atwood-Starkweather-Yahara Neighborhood on Madison's east side.

In addition to these publicly exhibited works, dozens of other totemic concrete sculptures still crowd the back yard of Boyum's former home and studio, now abandoned. Efforts are underway to preserve Boyum's home and art. Each year from 1963 to 1989, The Wisconsin State Journal commissioned Boyum to draw a different full-page, poster commemorating the opening of the Wisconsin fishing season. During his lifetime, Boyum also produced thousands of photographs (including a number of whimsical self-portraits), 16-millimeter films, drawings, paintings and bas-relief works.

Boyum was a close friend, collaborator and influence on other Wisconsin artists and collectors, including Baraboo's Tom Every (A.K.A. "Doctor Evermor"), creator of the Forevertron and Alex Jordan, Jr creator of the House on the Rock.

References

External links 
 Friends of Sid Boyum (nonprofit organization)
 The Sid Boyum Collection at the Wisconsin Historical Society
 "Sculpture by Sid Boyum - Art Conservation by Neighbors" - Design Coalition, Madison, Wisconsin
 Downtown Dailies documentary videos on Sid Boyum (Vimeo)
 Religion, Rock and Rebar: Wisconsin’s Outsider Folk Art Environments by Tony Rajer (Wisconsin Visual Artists)
 Madison Arts Commission Preservation Status Report on Sid Boyum's Public Sculptures

Industrial photographers
American graphic designers
Artists from Madison, Wisconsin
Outsider artists
1914 births
1991 deaths
Sculptors from Wisconsin